Perempuan Berkalung Sorban, released internationally as Woman With A Turban, is a 2009 Indonesian drama religion movies, The film was written by Ginatri S. Noer and Hanung Bramantyo & directed by Hanung Bramantyo, and stars Revalina S. Temat, Reza Rahadian, Oka Antara, and Widyawati. This film was released on January 15, 2009, and produced by Starvision Plus. Based on the novel by Abidah El Khalieqy, telling about Anissa, a Muslim woman, always understanding of a situation in her life, men always being positioned higher than women in any aspects of life. Anissa wanted man and woman is balance in gender. Anissa thinks in Muslim, the man is greatest than the woman. And the ending, Anissa know one thing that her wrongs and had a special 'chair' in Muslims.

Plot 
Anissa (Revalina S. Temat) comes from patriarchal society revolving around kyais (religious leaders) and religious boarding schools. From childhood, Anissa has always been treated unfairly due to her gender. The only person who treats her right is her uncle, Khudori who encourages her and shows her that there is a different world outside where men are not viewed as superior and women are treated more equally. Anissa’s love for Khudori (Oka Antara), her uncle, went unanswered as Khudori still is closely related with her family despite not being a blood relative Khudori represses his feeling and goes to Cairo to continue his education.

Khudori has always encouraged Anissa to continue her studies, however, Anissa’s father refuses, instead marrying her off to Samsudin (Reza Rahadian). As her world falls apart, Anissa finds out that Khudori has returned from Cairo. Khudori cannot do more than embrace and comfort her, just like any uncle to a niece. Unfortunately, Samsudin finds them together, a slander that changes everything. The incident causes the death of Anissa’s father.

After continuing her education, she finds that life outside religious boarding school has helped broaden her horizons. Eventually, her path 
crosses again with Khudori. This time, they decide to marry, even though their marriage takes them farther from their families. In the end, Anissa realises that asking for forgiveness is not a sign that she had done something wrong. In asking for forgiveness, Anissa promises that she will always endeavour to be a good Muslim woman, just like what her 
father and mother would have wanted.

Festivals 
 Film selected in the “ Cinema of the World “ Section of the 40th edition of International Film Festival of India (IFFI) to be held in Goa 23 November- 3 December 2009
 Movie References (2009) in Gajah Mada University (Strategy Marketing) & University Islam Negri (Questions and Answers covering the movie)
 Screening to France Audience in Lyon France for the South-east Asian Cinema Panorama of the Asian Connection Film Festival 2011 - date 19 - 23 Oct 2011

Cast 
Revalina S. Temat
Oka Antara
Reza Rahadian
Francine Roosenda
Widyawati
Eron Lebang
Frans Nicholas
Tika Putri
Risty Tagor
Joshua Pandelaki
Leroy Osmani
Cici Tegal
Ida Leman
Berliana Febrianty
Pangky Suwito
Piet Pagau
Nasya Abigail
Aditya Arif
Haikal Kamil

Awards 
2009 Indonesian Movie Awards
 Best Supporting Actress : Nasya Abigail
 Best Favourite Leading Actress : Revalina S. Temat
Film Festival Bandung 2009
 Best Actress : Revalina S. Temat
 Best Supporting Actress : Widyawati
 Best Best Cinematography : Faozan Rizal

References

External links
  Perempuan Berkalung Sorban – Starvision

2009 films
Indonesian drama films
2000s Indonesian-language films
Films shot in Indonesia
Films directed by Hanung Bramantyo
Films based on Indonesian novels